Banga is a town and municipality in the Cuanza Norte Province of Angola. The municipality had a population of 10,354 in 2014.

References

Populated places in Cuanza Norte Province
Municipalities of Angola